The World Architecture Survey was conducted in 2010 by Vanity Fair, to determine the most important works of contemporary architecture. 52 leading architects, teachers, and critics, including several Pritzker Prize winners and deans of major architecture schools were asked for their opinion.

The survey asked two questions:
What are the five most important buildings, bridges, or monuments constructed since 1980?
What is the greatest work of architecture thus far in the 21st century?

While the range of responses was very broad, more than half of the experts surveyed named the Guggenheim Museum Bilbao by Frank Gehry as one of the most important works since 1980.  The Beijing National Stadium (Bird’s Nest stadium) in Beijing by Herzog and de Meuron was the building most often cited, by seven respondents, as the most significant structure of the 21st century so far. Counted by architect, works by Frank Gehry received the most votes, followed by those of Rem Koolhaas. The result of the survey led Vanity Fair to label Gehry as "the most important architect of our age".

Results

Most important works since 1980
The respondents named a total of 132 different structures when asked to indicate the five most important buildings, monuments, and bridges completed since 1980. The top 21 were:
 Guggenheim Museum Bilbao (completed 1997) in Bilbao, Spain by Frank Gehry (28 votes)
 Menil Collection (1987) in Houston, Texas by Renzo Piano (10 votes)
 Thermal Baths of Vals (1996) in Vals, Switzerland by Peter Zumthor (9 votes)
 Hong Kong Shanghai Bank (HSBC) Building (1985) in Hong Kong by Norman Foster (7 votes)
 Tied (6 votes):
Seattle Central Library (2004) in Seattle by Rem Koolhaas 
Sendai Mediatheque (2001) in Sendai, Japan by Toyo Ito
Neue Staatsgalerie (1984) in Stuttgart, Germany by James Stirling
Church of the Light (1989) in Osaka, Japan by Tadao Ando
 Vietnam Veterans Memorial (1982) in Washington, D.C. by Maya Lin (5 votes)
 Tied (4 votes):
Millau Viaduct (2004) in France by Norman Foster
Jewish Museum, Berlin (1998) in Berlin by Daniel Libeskind
 Tied (3 votes):
Lloyd’s Building (1984) in London by Richard Rogers
Beijing National Stadium (2008) in Beijing by Jacques Herzog and Pierre de Meuron
CCTV Building (under construction ) in Beijing by Rem Koolhaas
Casa da Musica (2005) in Porto, Portugal by Rem Koolhaas
Cartier Foundation (1994) in Paris by Jean Nouvel
BMW Welt (2007) in Munich by COOP Himmelblau
Addition to the Nelson-Atkins Museum (2007) in Kansas City, Missouri by Steven Holl
Cooper Union building (2009) in New York by Thom Mayne
Parc de la Villette (1984) in Paris by Bernard Tschumi
Yokohama International Passenger Terminal (2002) at Ōsanbashi Pier in Yokohama, Japan by Foreign Office Architects
Saint-Pierre church, Firminy (2006) in Firminy, France by Le Corbusier (2 votes)

Most significant work of the 21st century
The buildings most often named as the greatest work of architecture thus far in the 21st century were:
Beijing National Stadium by Herzog and de Meuron (7 votes)
Saint-Pierre, Firminy by Le Corbusier (4 votes)
Seattle Central Library by Rem Koolhaas (3 votes)
CCTV Headquarters by Rem Koolhaas (2 votes)
 Tied with one vote each: Sendai Mediatheque (Toyo Ito), Millau Viaduct (Norman Foster), Casa da Musica (Rem Koolhaas), Cartier Foundation (Jean Nouvel), BMW Welt (COOP Himmelblau)

Criticism
Writing for the Chicago Tribune, Blair Kamin criticized the "self-aggrandizing" survey for not including any green buildings. In response, Lance Hosey of Architect magazine conducted an alternate survey of leading green building experts and found that no buildings appeared on both lists, suggesting that standards of "good design" and "green design" are misaligned. Commentators also noted that several of the architects surveyed (but not Gehry) "perhaps took the magazine’s title a little too seriously" and voted for their own buildings.

Participants
The following people replied to the survey:

 Stan Allen
 Tadao Ando
 George Baird
 Deborah Berke
 David Chipperfield
 Neil Denari
 Hank Dittmar
 Roger Duffy
 Peter Eisenman
 Martin Filler
 Norman Foster
 Kenneth B. Frampton
 Frank Gehry

 Richard Gluckman
 Paul Goldberger
 Michael Graves
 Zaha Hadid
 Hugh Hardy
 Steven Holl
 Hans Hollein
 Michael Holzer
 Michael Jemtrud
 Charles Jencks
 Leon Krier
 Daniel Libeskind
 Thom Mayne

 Richard Meier
 José Rafael Moneo
 Eric Owen Moss
 Mohsen Mostafavi
 Victoria Newhouse
 Jean Nouvel
 Richard Olcott
 John Pawson
 Cesar Pelli
 James Stewart Polshek
 Christian de Portzamparc
 Antoine Predock
 Wolf D. Prix

 Jaquelin T. Robertson
 Richard Rogers
 Joseph Rykwert
 Ricardo Scofidio
 Annabelle Selldorf
 Robert Siegel
 John Silber
 Brett Steele
 Bernard Tschumi
 Ben van Berkel
 Anthony Vidler
 Rafael Viñoly
 Tod Williams and Billie Tsien

See also
 Architectural icon

References

Architecture lists